Sahara Blue is a 1992 concept album produced by Hector Zazou. The album commemorated the 100th year of the death of French poet Arthur Rimbaud and included collaborative musical works by John Cale, Khaled, Ryuichi Sakamoto, Tim Simenon, and David Sylvian.

Track listing
 "I'll Strangle You" (Lyrics: Rimbaud, Music: Anneli Drecker, Bill Laswell, Hector Zazou, spoken word: Gérard Depardieu & Anneli Drecker)
 "First Evening" (Lyrics: Rimbaud, Music: Kent Condon, John Cale, Hector Zazou) 
 Ophelie (Music: David Sylvian) (feat. Dominique Dalcan & Ryuichi Sakamoto)
 Lines (feat. Barbara Gogan)
 Youth (feat. Lisa Gerrard & Brendan Perry)
 Hapolot Kenym (feat. Sussan Deyhim, Samy Birnbach & Ryuichi Sakamoto)
 Hunger (feat. John Cale & Vincent Kenis)
 Sahara Blue (feat. Barbara Gogan)
 Amdyaz (feat. Khaled & Malka Spigel)
 Black Stream (feat. Lisa Gerrard & Brendan Perry)
 Harar et les Gallas (feat. Ketema Mekonn & Ryuichi Sakamoto)
 Lettre Au Directeur Des Messageries Maritimes (feat. Richard Bohringer, Sussan Deyhim & Bill Laswell)

Personnel
Samy Birnbach - Vocals
Richard Bohringer - Vocals, Voices
John Cale - Vocals
Kent Condon - Guitar
Dominique Dalcan - Chant
Gérard Depardieu - Vocals, Voices
Sussan Deyhim - Vocals, Voices
Anneli Marian Drecker - Vocals, Voices
Yuka Fujii - Walkie Talkie
Lisa Gerrard - Vocals, Yang Chin
Barbara Gogan - Vocals
Kerry Hopwood - MIDI, Programming
Kenji Jammer - Guitar, Guitar Effects
Vincent Kenis - Bass, Guitar
Nabil Khalidi - Oud
Bill Laswell - Bass, Beats, Effects
Keith LeBlanc - Percussion
Christian Lechevretel - Arranger, Clavier, Organ, Trombone, Trumpet
Lightwave - Electronic Percussion, Special Effects, Synthesizer
Daniel Manzanas - Guitar (Acoustic)
Denis Moulin - Guitar, Percussion
Mr. X - Guitar, Vocals, Walkie Talkie
Brendan Perry - Bodhran, Darbouka, Engineer, Percussion, Synthesizer, Tin Whistle, Vocals
Renaud Pion - Clarinet, Flute (Bass), Saxophone
Ryuichi Sakamoto - Piano
Steve Shehan - Percussion
Guy Sigsworth - Keyboards
Tim Simenon - Beats, Mixing, Producer, Sample Programming
Malka Spigel - Vocals, Voices
Matt Stein - Loops, Programming
David Sylvian - Guitar, Vocals, Walkie Talkie
Hector Zazou - Clavier, Electronics, Guitar, Keyboards, Mixing, Producer, Sampled Guitar, Sampling, Synthesizer

References

1992 albums
Concept albums
Hector Zazou albums
Musical settings of poems by Arthur Rimbaud
Crammed Discs albums